Le Guide du Dahomey was a short-lived but influential newspaper in Dahomey. The paper was published weekly from Cotonou between 1920 and 1922 over 88 issues under the editorship of Dorothée Lima and Jean Adjovi. Its critical tone and regular production paved the way for the expansion of Dahomean media from the 1920s onwards.

See also
La Voix du Dahomey
List of newspapers in Benin

References

Defunct newspapers
French West Africa
French-language newspapers published in Africa
Newspapers published in Benin
Newspapers established in 1920
Publications disestablished in 1922